Pinarayi Vijayan (born 24 May 1945) is an Indian Communist politician who is the current Chief Minister of Kerala, serving since 25 May 2016.  A member of the Politburo of the Communist Party of India (Marxist), he is the longest-serving secretary of the Kerala State Committee of the CPI(M) (1998–2015). He also served in the government of Kerala as Minister of Electric Power and Co-operatives from 1996 to 1998. Vijayan won a seat in the May 2016 Kerala Legislative Assembly election as the CPI(M) candidate for Dharmadom constituency and was selected as the leader of the Left Democratic Front (LDF) and became the 12th Chief Minister of Kerala. He is the first chief minister from Kerala to be re-elected after completing a full term (five years) in office.

Personal life and education 

Vijayan was born on 24 May 1945 in Pinarayi, Kannur, Kerala, as the youngest son of Koran and Kalyani. He had 14 siblings of whom only three survived. After graduating from school, he worked as a handloom weaver for a year before joining for a pre-university course in the Government Brennen College, Thalassery. Subsequently, he earned B.A. Economics degree from the same college.

He is married to Kamala Vijayan and has two children. His wife is a retired teacher.

Political career 

Pinarayi Vijayan entered politics through student union activities at Government Brennen College, Thalassery. He eventually joined the Communist Party of India (Marxist) in 1964. Vijayan became Kannur district secretary of the Kerala Students Federation (KSF), which later became the Students Federation of India (SFI). He went on to become the state secretary and subsequently the state president of KSF. He then moved on to Kerala State Youth Federation (KSYF), which later became the Democratic Youth Federation of India (DYFI). He became the president of the state committee. During that period, when communists in Kerala were organising the political activities from different hide-outs, Pinarayi Vijayan was imprisoned for one and a half years.

Later, he was elected as the president of the Kerala state co-operative bank. During the emergency, he was arrested and tortured by police. He became the Kannur district secretary of the CPI(M) when M.V. Raghavan left the party over the 'alternative document' row. Within three years, he became a member of the State Secretariat. He was elected to the Assembly in 1970, 1977 and 1991 from Kuthuparamba, in 1996 from Payyanur and in 2016 from Dharmadom. He was the Minister for Electric power and Co-operatives in the E.K. Nayanar ministry from 1996 to 1998. In 1998, he became the state secretary of the CPI(M), following the death of the incumbent Chadayan Govindan. He was elected to the Politburo of the CPI(M) in 2002.

On 26 May 2007 the CPI(M) suspended Pinarayi Vijayan and V. S. Achuthanandan from the Politburo for their public remarks on each other. Pinarayi was reinstated into the Politburo later.

Assembly election candidature history

Positions held 
 State president and secretary of Kerala Student's Federation and president of Kerala State Youth Federation.
 President of Kerala State Co-operative Bank
 Elected to Kerala Legislative Assembly in 1970, 1977, 1991, 1996 ,2016 and 2021.
 Minister in Kerala government between 1996 and 1998.
 Secretary of the Kerala state committee of the CPI(M) between 1998 and 2015.
 Member of the CPI(M) politburo from 2002.
 Chief Minister of Kerala from 25 May 2016.
 Sworn in as the Chief Minister of Kerala for the second time in a row on 20 May 2021.

Chief Minister 

Following the 2016 Legislative Assembly election, Pinarayi Vijayan became the Chief Minister of Kerala. The swearing-in ceremony of his Left Democratic Front ministry with 19-member cabinet was held on 25 May 2016. Vijayan held the charge of Home Affairs & Vigilance Departments along with the other portfolios normally held by the Chief Ministers, and not mentioned elsewhere. He is elected from Dharmadom constituency.

Main achievements 

 In first of its kind in India, the Pinarayi Vijayan ministry introduced a yearly Progress Report to mark accountability and transparency of the ruling front. The report contained the evaluation and performance of the ministry with respect to the promises in the election manifesto released by Left Democratic Front. His ministry made history by keeping 570 of 600 poll promises mentioned in the election manifesto by December 2020.
 His ministry introduced four missions for building Nava Keralam, a project expected to have a transformational effect on Kerala in the long run. The missions include LIFE Mission, a project to solve the problems of all categories of people including the homeless and landless and those who could not complete their house construction after starting it. It completed more than 2 lakh homes for the homeless. The Ardram Mission aimed at a total overhaul of the public health sector making it people friendly, affordable for the poorest, and a means to provide substantial state of the art infrastructure facilities. It extended super specialty facilities that was earlier limited to medical colleges, to district and taluk hospitals as well. The Haritha Keralam Mission was a comprehensive project implemented to clear and remove waste from all the water bodies in Kerala; ponds, rivers, lakes and streams. The mission was a participatory program on the lines of literacy mission, democratic decentralization and people's planning and it involved the removal of solid waste, removal of waste water and measures to increase the area of land under cultivation are being undertaken under this project. The Education Mission, proposed comprehensive educational reforms including upgrading one thousand government schools into international standards during the first phase and steadily improved the infrastructure for the education in Kerala. Kerala thereafter became the first fully digital state in the country in the field of public education, with the completion of the ‘hi-tech classroom and hi-tech lab’ projects in government-owned schools.
His ministry offered 1,03,361 title deeds for landless people, found 22,000 hectares for additional paddy cultivation, restored 17182  square kilometers of water bodies, distributed 8,500,000 free Handloom School Uniforms, built 45,000 high tech classrooms, ensured 341,293 new student enrollment in public schools and enlarged 5,000,000 sq.ft. as a newly built-up area for Information Technology.
 Kerala became the first state in India to provide employment reservation in rail network (Kochi Metro) for transgender people. His ministry also provided reservation for transgender students pursuing degrees in the Arts and Sciences in graduation and post graduation.
 For the first time in India, an all-woman police squad called Pink Patrol was introduced in Kerala to ascertain the security of women and children in public places. 
 His tenure saw Kerala becoming first fully electrified State and fully open-defecation-free State in India. The 'filament free state', a project to bring in affordable LED bulbs in all households in Kerala also received good public attention .
He launched Kerala Bank and Kerala Administrative Service.
He completed Kochi-Mangaluru natural gas pipeline, GAIL Pipeline project.
Kerala ranked as Best Governed State by Public Affairs Index, Excellence Award 2017 of Cops Today International. 
Pinarayi Vijayan earned the title Crisis Manager, after handling Cyclone Ockhi in 2017, Nipah outbreak in 2018, two Kerala Floods in 2018 and 2019 and Covid-19 pandemic in 2020.

Awards and honours
 Pinarayi Vijayan was awarded Gandhidarshan award for best chief minister in 2018
The Institute of Human Virology honoured Pinarayi Vijayan for effective control of 2018 Nipah virus outbreak in Kerala in Baltimore, United States. Noted bio-medical scientist and co-founder of the institute Robert Gallo presented awards to the Chief Minister and the Health Minister of Kerala.

Controversies 

Pinarayi Vijayan was one among the accused in Kerala's first political murder case, of that of Vadikkal Ramakrishnan who was killed by an axe on 28 April 1969. Though the court acquitted all the accused of lack of evidence, this has been used by various political opponents to portray the violent nature of CPI(M)-RSS conflicts in Kannur which has taken more than 200 lives of supporters from both factions.

The SNC Lavalin controversy in Kerala was a major allegation that rocked Kerala politics. The Comptroller and Auditor General of India report had stated that the deal Vijayan had struck as electricity minister in 1998 with Lavalin, a Canadian firm, for the repair of three generators, had cost the state exchequer a staggering Rs 375 crores. On 16 January 2007, Kerala High Court ordered a CBI enquiry into the SNC Lavalin case. There are also reports that the CAG did not report any losses to state exchequer, but that the project did not yield commensurate gains. Pinarayi Vijayan had been named as the 9th accused in the case by CBI. CPI(M) backed Pinarayi saying that the CBI move was "politically motivated". Party viewed the implication of Pinarayi in the case is to settle scores with the CPM after the party withdrew its support to the UPA government. The CPM led Kerala Government decided not to let Vijayan to be prosecuted in the case. Over-ruling the cabinet recommendation, the Governor allowed CBI to prosecute Vijayan. Though CPI(M) called Governor's move un-constitutional, then Kerala Chief Minister V.S. Achuthanandan said there is nothing surprising or wrong in Governor's decision. On 5 November 2013, the CBI special court discharged Pinarayi Vijayan and the others accused from the list of accused in the SNC-Lavalin Case. The court has allowed a plea made by Pinarayi Vijayan asking his name to be removed from the list of accused in the case. The court held that there isn't any proof of dishonest and fraudulent intentions, abuse of official position and cheating.

On 16 February 2007 the airport security in Chennai Airport recovered five bullets from Vijayan's baggage. The Chennai airport security let him off after receiving a faxed copy of his license.

As CPI(M) state secretary, Pinarayi Vijayan demanded that the Catholic Church in Kerala withdraw a controversial pastoral letter. The letter recommended a "liberation struggle" on the lines of the one in the 1950s to liberate the education sector in Kerala from state control so that the management could charge fees and capitation without government intervention. On 16 October 2007, Pinarayi called Paul Chitilapally, the bishop of Thamarassery in Kerala, a "wretched creature". He was speaking at a memorial remembrance of Mathai Chacko, MLA from Thamarassery and a CPI(M) member. He said "A lie is a lie, and just because it is uttered by a bishop it does not become a holy lie." Later, the Syro-Malabar Catholic Church in arms against the CPI(M) leadership for his comments against the bishop. However, he repeated the same and stuck to his comments. This led to a heated discussion among the Catholic community across the state to protest against his speech by closing all educational institutions run by the church. During the 2018 Kerala floods, the Government of Kerala was accused of misappropriating a large amount from the Chief Minister's Distress Relief Fund which was collected during the floods.

The First Vijayan ministry was accused of appointment of relatives of party members in various departments of the Government of Kerala. The appointments were accused by the UDF-led opposition.

In the COVID-19 pandemic, the LDF was accused of using the US-based tech firm Sprinklr to access the health data of about 175,000 individuals.

Life Mission controversy

Kerala Public Service Commission row over temporary appointments and delay of appointments from rank lists to permanent posts.

Deep sea fishing controversy over deal between Kerala Industrial Development Corporation (KIDC) and EMCC International India Private Limited.

Covid protocol violations.

In 2020, Vijayan faced heat from various opposition parties after several members of the chief minister's office were accused in the 2020 Kerala gold smuggling case. The suspended principal secretary of IT department Mr. M. Shivasankar was arrested in connection with the investigation of the Gold smuggling case.

In May 2021, the Kerala government planned to spend ₹98 lakh to renovate the CM's residence, and PWD granted the project to the Uralungal Society without inviting tenders.

References

External links 

 Pinarayi Vijayan discusses the future of the left in India. Tehelka, Volume 12 Issue 17, Dated 25 April 2015.

Communist Party of India (Marxist) politicians from Kerala
People from Kannur district
Malayali politicians
1945 births
Living people
Kerala MLAs 1970–1977
Kerala MLAs 1977–1979
Kerala MLAs 1991–1996
Kerala MLAs 2016–2021
Chief Ministers of Kerala
Chief ministers from Communist Party of India (Marxist)